Kacper Oleszczuk (born 15 May 1994 in Pasłęk) is a Polish athlete specialising in the javelin throw. He won the gold medal at the 2015 European U23 Championships.

His personal best in the event is 82.29 metres set in Tallinn in 2015.

International competitions

Seasonal bests by year

2012 - 71.42
2013 - 75.39
2014 - 77.46
2015 - 82.29
2016 - 80.97

References

1994 births
Living people
Polish male javelin throwers
People from Pasłęk

pl:Łukasz Grzeszczuk